

Cyneberht was a medieval Bishop of Winchester. He was consecrated between 781 and 785. In 801 he accompanied Archbishop Æthelhard of Canterbury to Rome. Cyneberht died between 801 and 803.

Citations

References

External links
 

Bishops of Winchester
8th-century English bishops
800s deaths
Year of birth unknown
Year of death uncertain